Gidix Nasa (born 27 January 1968) is a Papua New Guinean former footballer who played as a defender.

International career
He won six caps for the Papua New Guinea national football team between 1996 and 1997.

See also
Football in Papua New Guinea
List of football clubs in Papua New Guinea

References

External links

1968 births
Living people
Papua New Guinean footballers
Papua New Guinea international footballers
Association football defenders